Talavasal is a state assembly constituency in Salem district in Tamil Nadu. It is a Scheduled Caste reserved constituency. Elections and winners in the constituency are listed below. Election was not held in year 1957.

Madras State

Tamil Nadu

Election results

2006

2001

1996

1991

1989

1984

1980

1977

1971

1967

1962

1952

References

External links
 

Former assembly constituencies of Tamil Nadu
Salem district